Ewout and Ewoud (both pronounced ) are Dutch masculine given names cognate to German Ewald and originally meaning "one who rules by the law". People with this name include:

Anthony Ewoud Jan Modderman (1838–1885), Dutch Minister of Justice
Ewout van Asbeck (born 1956), Dutch field hockey player
Ewout Denijs (born 1987), Belgian footballer
 (1873–1955), Dutch physicist and meteorologist
Ewout Genemans (born 1985), Dutch television producer, presenter, singer and actor
Ewoud Gommans (born 1990), Dutch volleyball player
Ewout Holst (born 1978), Dutch swimmer
Ewout Irrgang (born 1976), Dutch Socialist Party politician
Ewoud Sanders (born 1958), Dutch historian and journalist.
Marko Ewout Koers (born 1972), Dutch middle-distance runner

References

Dutch masculine given names